is a Japanese actress. She first gained recognition in the 2005 film Swing Girls where she was a recipient of Newcomer of the Year prize at the Japanese Academy Awards. Ueno achieved mainstream success for playing the titular role in the live-action adaptations of manga Nodame Cantabile for which she won Best Lead Actress at the 51st Television Drama Academy Awards in 2007. She further gained acclaim with her role in the television series Last Friends for which she won Best Supporting Actress at the Nikkan Sports Drama Grand Prix and the 57th Television Drama Academy Awards in 2008.

Career
Ueno made her television debut in 2002 at the age of 16 in the NHK series Seizon before making her first film major appearance in 2003 in Chirosoku no Natsu which won her the Sponichi Grand Prize New Talent Award at the Mainichi Film Awards along with her performance in the 2004 film, Swing Girls. Swing Girls proved to be a breakthrough when she received critical acclaim and awards for Best Newcomer at the Yokohama Film Festival (she was also honored for her performance in Joze to Tora to Sakana Tachi) and the Japanese Academy Awards.

In 2004, Ueno took on a supporting role in TBS's romance drama, Orange Days, and co-starred in 2005 with Takuya Kimura in Fuji TV's romantic comedy Engine as Misae Hoshino. She also appeared with Kazuya Kamenashi in the special television movie of Kinda'ichi Shōnen no Jikenbo the same year taking over the role of Miyuki Nanase from Anne Suzuki.

Ueno's popularity rose further when she was cast as Megumi Noda ("Nodame") in the 2006 live-action television adaptation of the popular manga Nodame Cantabile. Co-starring opposite Hiroshi Tamaki, the series' 11-episode run was a success with an average viewership rating of 18.79% with the season finalé garnering 21.7% of the viewership share for its time slot. Ueno's portrayal as the eccentric and disorganized but yet extremely affable and talented pianist won her "Best Lead Actress" at the 51st Television Drama Academy Awards while the show won "Best Drama". The show was also recognized overseas at the 2nd Seoul Drama Festival where it was awarded "Best Miniseries". Ueno and Tamaki reprised their roles in 2007 in the two-part special, Nodame Cantabile Shinshun Special in Europe, which chronicles their individual struggles to achieve success on Europe's storied classical music stage whilst being away from each other.

In 2008, Ueno reunited with Nodame co-stars Eita and Asami Mizukawa in Fuji TV's drama, Last Friends, as Ruka Kishimoto, a talented motocross racer with a hidden secret she cannot discuss with friends or family. Taeko Asano, the screenwriter of Last Friends praised Ueno's acting of Ruka, stating that Ueno is a "natural genius" and that she became "the character itself". Ueno won "Best Supporting Actress" at the 12th Nikkan Sports Drama Grand Prix and The 57th Television Drama Academy Awards for her role. She was recognised as "Best Student Voice Actress" at the 2008 MTV Student Voice Awards for her role in Wanko.

The Japanese version of Vogue named her as one of the "Women of the Year 2008".

On 9 December 2008, it was announced that she would reprise her role as "Nodame" in a new Nodame Cantabile two-movie sequel slated for release in 2010, with filming to start in May 2009.

On 25 January 2010, it was announced that Ueno would be the lead in the 2011 NHK Taiga drama Gō based on an original script by Atsuhime writer . with filming starting in August 2010. The series is Ueno's first role in a historical drama. Gō is NHK's 50th Taiga drama, and only its 10th drama with a woman as the main character. On April 15, 2010, Ueno took the role of "Haru" in the spring J-Drama Sunao ni Narenakute which tells a story of the blossoming friendship between five people through Twitter, along with Eita, Hero Jaejoong, Megumi Seki and Tetsuji Tamayama.

On 11 September 2010, Ueno guest starred in the Korean variety show MBC's We Got Married Season 2 while promoting Nodame Cantabile - The Movie and paid a visit to SNSD's Seohyun and CN Blue's Jung Yong-hwa. In 2013 she returned to acting with a leading role in the romance film Girl in the Sunny Place opposite actor Jun Matsumoto which was based on the best selling novel of the same name. The film opened in Japanese theaters on October 12 and was a commercial success topping the box office and grossing ¥763 million after eight days.

In 2014 she starred in the TBS revenge drama Alice no Toge as Mizuno Asumi a young woman who becomes a doctor at the hospital her father was treated at in order to get revenge on those responsible for his death. This was followed by another leading role in the TBS television drama Ouroboros based on the manga of the same name and opposite actors Toma Ikuta and Shun Oguri. This marks her first time starring in a detective drama. and she joined alongside Korean singer TOP for romantic Web drama titled Secret Message

Personal life 
Ueno married Triceratops band member Sho Wada on May 26, 2016.

Filmography

Film

Television

Photo books 
 A Piacere (2006)

Selected awards

2005
 28th Japanese Academy Awards – Newcomer of the Year for Swing Girls
 59th Mainichi Film Awards: Sponichi Grand Prize New Talent Award – Best Newcomer for Swing Girls and Chirusoku no Natsu
 25th Yokohama Film Festival – Best New Talent for Swing Girls, Joze to tora to sakana tachi and Chirusoku no Natsu

2007
 51st Television Drama Academy Awards – Best Lead Actress for Nodame Cantabile
 Elan d'or Awards – Best Newcomer for Nodame Cantabile

2008
 12th Nikkan Sports Drama Grand Prix Award (Spring 2008) – Best Supporting Actress for Last Friends
 The Galaxy Award – monthly award (June), for the performance in Last Friends
 57th Television Drama Academy Awards – Best Supporting Actress for Last Friends
 MTV Student Voice Award – Best Student Voice Actress
 21st Japan Best Dressed Eyes Awards – Special Award
 International Drama Festival in Tokyo Awards 2008 – Best Actress for Nodame Cantabile in Europe
 Vogue – Women of the Year 2008

2009
 TV Life 18th Annual Drama Awards 2008 – Best Supporting Actress for Last Friends
 TV Navi Drama of The Year 2008 – Best Supporting Actress for Last Friends
 17th Hashida Awards – Best Newcomer

References

External links

Official website

1986 births
Living people
People from Kakogawa, Hyōgo
Japanese child actresses
Japanese film actresses
Japanese television actresses
Taiga drama lead actors
Amuse Inc. talents
21st-century Japanese actresses
21st-century Japanese singers
21st-century Japanese women singers